Ivars Godmanis (born 27 November 1951) is a Latvian politician who served as the Prime Minister of Latvia from 1990 to 1993 and again from 2007 to 2009. He was the first Prime Minister of Latvia after the country restored its independence from the Soviet Union.

Political career
Godmanis served as Prime Minister from 1990 to 1993, focusing primarily on Latvia's difficult economic transition from planned to market economy. In 1995 Godmanis was awarded with the Order of the Three Stars. He later served as the Minister of Finance from 1998 to 1999. He was originally associated with the Latvian Popular Front, but after the Front ceased to exist he moved to the Latvian Way party. In November 2006, following elections in which the Latvian Way in coalition with Latvia's First Party returned to Parliament, Godmanis became the Minister of the Interior.

On 14 December 2007, Godmanis was nominated as Prime Minister by President Valdis Zatlers. He was approved by the parliament on 20 December, with 54 votes in favor and 43 in opposition.

On 18 June 2008 he suffered head injuries in a car accident when his official limousine was involved in a collision with a small bus.

On 19 September 2008 he replaced Roger Taylor on drums during Queen + Paul Rodgers' performance of "All Right Now" at a concert in Riga.

Economic problems and corruption charges caused the popularity of Godmanis's government to plummet. In January 2009, anti-government protests turned into the worst riots the country has seen since re-gaining independence in 1991. On 20 February 2009, Godmanis resigned as Prime Minister along with the rest of his government over concerns about handling the economic crisis. On 26 February 2009, President Valdis Zatlers appointed former finance minister Valdis Dombrovskis as the new prime minister; he was sworn in on 12 March 2009.

See also
 First Godmanis cabinet
 Second Godmanis cabinet

References

External links

Government of Latvia, The Cabinet of Ministers of the Republic of Latvia: Prime Minister

1951 births
Living people
Politicians from Riga
Popular Front of Latvia politicians
Latvian Way politicians
Latvia's First Party/Latvian Way politicians
Prime Ministers of Latvia
Ministers of the Interior of Latvia
Ministers of Finance of Latvia
Deputies of the Supreme Council of the Republic of Latvia
Deputies of the 7th Saeima
Deputies of the 9th Saeima
Latvia's First Party/Latvian Way MEPs
MEPs for Latvia 2009–2014
People of the Singing Revolution
Riga State Gymnasium No.1 alumni
University of Latvia alumni
Recipients of the Order of the Cross of Terra Mariana, 1st Class